Sunblock is a Swedish electronic production group, consisting of Martin Pihl and Magnus Nordin, with dancers Oksana Andersson, Rebecca Simonsson and Pernilla Lundberg being the focal point of the group.

Musical career
The group remixed the Baywatch official theme "I'm Always Here", released as "I'll Be Ready" in 2006. It reached number four on the UK Singles Chart.

Their second single, "First Time", is a remix of the 1988 hit song by Robin Beck. The original song featured on Coca-Cola adverts in the late 1980s. It reached number nine on the UK Singles Chart.

Sunblock's third single is a cover of a 1995 single by Corona called "Baby Baby" and features the original singer, Sandy Chambers.

Discography

Albums 
 I'll Be Ready: The Album (2006)

Singles

References

External links 
Jukebo video clips

Swedish dance music groups